Stepney railway station  may refer to:

Stepney railway station, now known as Limehouse station, in the east of London, England
Stepney railway station (East Riding of Yorkshire), in Stepney, Kingston upon Hull, England

See also
Stepney Green tube station